Pteryx UAV is a Polish Miniature UAV designed for civilian use, manufactured and sold by TriggerComposites. The machine can be classified both as a flying RC model and pre-programmed vehicle. It has received a medal for innovative design in the category of micro-enterprises of the Podkarpacie region: Innowator Podkarpacia 2010.

Origin
It uses a custom derivation of FLEXIPILOT, designed by Aerial Robotics engineering group for photomapping purposes and civilian use in general.

The avionics and flying platform are designed with the idea of having full operational capability without using either an active transmitter or a ground station.

Capabilities

 Delivering data for generating digital elevation model using external photogrammetric software and orthorectification procedure
(Example: Bezmiechowa 3D model)
 Delivering data for precision agriculture obtaining surface maps using mosaicking software
 Construction site and long-range linear mapping (up to around 40 km both ways with 2h flight time, reserve included)
(Example: Motorway construction site mapping mission) often requiring georeferencing of the data obtained
 Carrying custom research equipment

The camera mount contains either pre-installed compact digital camera, or is left for the user for integration.

The camera can be mounted down-looking (nadir photography) or side-looking (oblique photography).

The whole head can be also tilted in flight using RC transmitter, while reducing stabilization travel to one of the sides.

Features

Its features among miniature (sub-5 kg TOW) civilian UAVs
include roll-stabilized camera head, fully integrated parachute and Rotary Mission Selector. Key design requirements included:
 flying multiple missions per day without reprogramming the autopilot (the waypoints being selected by mission selector and evaluated relative to takeoff)
 ability to rearrange camera head interior with minimal effort
 single button operation
 no need for ground station
 enclosing the camera for better protection against dirt
 ability to accommodate most powerful compact digital camera models, weight range 200...1000g
 Takeoff: using bungee, or bungee with rails. Fully automatic takeoff triggered by holding Start button and automatic preflight testing.
 Landing: using parachute deployed automatically (possible forced opening using RC transmitter), aircraft style belly landing in automatic mode (only when reusing a single airfield, about 250x100m area required without obstacles on approach) or in manual mode (same as flying RC models).

Precision
(manufacturer's data)

The aircraft provides positions of the photos taken; more than 8000 events can be recorded.
Ground-projected positions include the following errors:
 GPS position error up to 5m, usually around 2.5m, this is typical for GPS mounted on flying vehicles.
 Altitude drift (up to 5m per 1 hour of flight)
 Camera head stabilization precision (transients up to 5 deg, typically 2 deg)
 Fuselage pitch due to turbulence (up to 8 deg during hot weather, typically 2 deg in winter)
 Camera mounting error (typically 1-4deg if not calibrated)
 Heading/yaw error (the aircraft performs crabbing in presence of wind)
Those errors nullify themselves during stitching and orthorectification of the images. The use of a roll-stabilized head increases useful area coverage (reducing distortion at map edges) and improving stitch quality inside during turbulent weather. In order to obtain georeferenced maps, it is necessary to provide positions of the object on-site or simply viewing the stitched image in Google earth (accepting occasional 50m position error vs true coordinates, but usually correct dimensions).

Typical orthophoto map precision (mean reprojection errors):
 10 cm horizontal
 30 cm vertical
 around 2.5m global shift to be removed with a few locally measured points
The precision of an orthophoto map created with professional processing chain depends on Ground Sampling Distance or Ground Pixel Size (variable 5 cm/pixel to 20 cm/pixel depending on flight altitude). With Ground Control Points provided, horizontal accuracy of the map as a whole improves from a few meters to GSD (5 cm to 20 cm). Vertical accuracy of produced DSM (always internally generated for orthorectification) is in the order of 3 GSD, i.e., 15 cm to 60 cm. Regardless of the use of Ground Control Points, the map is self-consistent geometrically within 1 GSD.

Data processing strategies

Several data processing approaches are possible depending on application:
 Direct photo examination
 Non-georeferenced image stitching using free software
 Using free 3D modelling services, as mentioned in examples section
 Importing each photo as ground overlay in Google Earth (semi-automatic with supplied software)
 Using pre-paid service based on cloud computing, yielding a result in hours (delivers Orto photomap and optionally DSM)
 Local processing using specialized GIS software created specifically for large scale image mosaicking (delivers Orto photomap and optionally DSM)

System components
 Fuselage
 3-section wings with mounting screws
 Horizontal stabilizer section
 Parachute

User's equipment
 LiPo batteries (user's equipment)
 Laptop or netbook for occasional diagnostics or data log download (not required for takeoff nor pre-flight)
 Compact digital camera
 RC controller compliant with local laws (see Radio-controlled aircraft Transmitting and Receiving Frequencies)

General characteristics
Masses:
 Maximum takeoff weight 5.0 kg (fits RC model plane regulations in most countries)
Dimensions:
 Wingspan: 2.8 m
 Length: 1.4 m
 Height:  0.33 m
 Propulsion: brushless DC electric motor and rechargeable lithium polymer battery
 Endurance: 55min with 1 kg payload, 120min with 450g payload
V speeds:
 VC: around 50 km/h
 VS: 34–38 km/h depending on TOW
 VA: 120 km/h
 VNE: 160 km/h
Flight altitude:
 Service Ceiling 3000m Pteryx Lite
 Service Ceiling 1200m Pteryx Pro
 Cruise altitude 100-520m AGL, 250m typical - dictated by photo resolution
Handling:
 Assembly time: Around 5min (only 2 screws and no electrical connections).
 Materials: Custom fiberglass composite material covered with durable red gelcoat, carbon fiber and Kevlar reinforcements, wood and other plastics. A choice of wooden or all-composite wings with styrofoam core, painted and waterproof.

References

External links
 https://web.archive.org/web/20120112174709/http://pteryx.eu/Project webpages

Unmanned aerial vehicles of Poland